Radium Institute can refer to:

 Curie Institute, Paris
 Curie Institute, Warsaw
 V. G. Khlopin Radium Institute
 London Radium Institute
 Manchester and District Radium Institute
 National Radium Institute, USA
 Sino-Belgium Radium Institute

See also
 Institute for Radium Research, Vienna
 American Radium Society
 National Radium Trust, UK
 Radium (disambiguation)